Bossiaea spinosa is a species of flowering plant in the family Fabaceae and is endemic to the south-west of Western Australia. It is a low, dense prostrate or rounded, twiggy shrub with egg-shaped to elliptic leaves and deep yellow to orange and pinkish-red, pea-like flowers.

Description

Taxonomy and naming
This species was first formally described in 1853 by Nikolai Turczaninow who gave it the name Platylobium spinosum in the Bulletin de la Société impériale des naturalistes de Moscou from specimens collected by James Drummond. In 1923, Karel Domin changed the name to Bossiaea spinosa. The specific epithet (spinosa) means "spiny".

Distribution and habitat
This species of pea grows in mallee and heathland between Lake Grace, Ongerup and Ravensthorpe in the Avon Wheatbelt, Esperance Plains and Mallee biogeographic regions of south-western Western Australia.

Conservation status
Bossiaea spinosa is classified as "Priority Three" by the Government of Western Australia Department of Biodiversity, Conservation and Attractions, meaning that it is poorly known and known from only a few locations but is not under imminent threat.

References

spinosa
Mirbelioids
Rosids of Western Australia
Taxa named by Nikolai Turczaninow
Plants described in 1853